William Alexander Knyvett (May 28, 1882 – February 13, 1929) was a British track and field athlete who competed in the 1908 Summer Olympics.

He was born in Jessore, British Raj, modern-day Bangladesh. He was the son of A. V. Knyvett CIE and he followed in his father's footsteps as a member of the Bengali Police.

Reaching the semi-finals of the 110 metre hurdles competition, he finished with the second fastest time overall of all the semi-final heats. Nevertheless, as he was second in his heat, he was eliminated. The winner of his heat, Forrest Smithson of the USA, went on to win the Olympic Gold Medal in the final.

References

External links
 William Alexander Knyvett. The Malvern Register (1865–1904), 1905, p. 390.

1882 births
1929 deaths
British male hurdlers
Olympic athletes of Great Britain
Athletes (track and field) at the 1908 Summer Olympics
People from Jessore District
British colonial police officers